Amboyna furcifera is a species of moth of the family Tortricidae. It is found in Indonesia, where it has been recorded from Ambon Island.

References

Moths described in 1964
Tortricini
Moths of Indonesia